Beveridge Reef is a mostly submerged, unpopulated atoll located in the Exclusive Economic Zone of Niue. It has been the cause of several fishing boats running aground or sinking.

Characteristics

The Beveridge Reef is a coral atoll that is approximately 130 miles (209 km) from Niue and 600 miles (966 km) from the Cook Islands. The reef is normally submerged, with a small part visible at low tide.

Wrecks
The reef is the site of frequent shipwrecks: 
in 1918, the schooner James H. Bruce, 
the Nicky Lou of Seattle, a fiberglass hulled fishing vessel that ran aground on the reef, can be seen on the reef, and 
in 2017, the catamaran Avanti.

See also
 Niue Nukutuluea

References

External links 
 Beveridge Reef by Wolfgang Schippke
 Geography and geology of Niue
 Exploring new frontiers off Niue, Skin Diver Online

Former islands
Landforms of Niue
Reefs of the Pacific Ocean
Reefs of Oceania